Lara Marti (born 21 September 1999) is a Swiss footballer who plays as a midfielder for Bayer Leverkusen and the Switzerland national team.

Career
She made her debut for the Switzerland national team on 14 June 2019 against Serbia, starting the match.

References

1999 births
Living people
Women's association football midfielders
Swiss women's footballers
Switzerland women's international footballers
Bayer 04 Leverkusen (women) players
Footballers from Basel
FC Basel Frauen players
Swiss Women's Super League players
Frauen-Bundesliga players
Swiss expatriate sportspeople in Germany
Expatriate women's footballers in Germany
UEFA Women's Euro 2022 players
Swiss expatriate women's footballers